Jean Knight (née Caliste; born January 26, 1943) is an American R&B and soul singer from New Orleans, Louisiana. Launching her professional career in the mid–1960s, Knight is perhaps best known for her 1971 hit single, "Mr. Big Stuff" released by Stax Records.

Biography

Early years
She was born in New Orleans, Louisiana, to Louis Joseph Caliste (died 1953) and Florence Edwards. After graduating from high school, she began singing at her cousin's bar, 'Laura's Place' and caught the attention of many different bands who were willing to accompany her. In 1965, she recorded a demo of a cover version of Jackie Wilson's song "Stop Doggin' Me Around." Her demo attracted record producer Huey Meaux, who signed her to a recording contract at the Jet Star/Tribe record labels. Shortly thereafter, she adopted the professional name of "Jean Knight," because she felt that her surname Caliste was too hard to pronounce. Knight recorded four singles, making a name for herself locally, but was not able to attract any national attention. By the late 1960s, it was obvious that Knight's career was not living up to her high expectations, so she went to work as a baker in the cafeteria of Dominican College in New Orleans.

Success at Stax
In early 1970, Knight was discovered by songwriter Ralph Williams, who wanted her to record some songs. With Williams' connections, Knight came in contact with record producer Wardell Quezergue. In May of that year, Knight went to Malaco Studios in Jackson, Mississippi, for a recording session during which she recorded "Mr. Big Stuff." After the session was finished, the song was shopped to producers at several national labels, all of whom rejected it. But when King Floyd's hit "Groove Me" (also recorded at Malaco Studios) became a #1 R&B hit in early 1971, a producer at Stax Records remembered Knight's recording of "Mr. Big Stuff," and released it. The song also proved to be an instant smash in 1971, reaching No. 2 on the pop chart and becoming a No. 1 R&B hit. It went double-platinum and received a Grammy nomination for Best R&B Vocal Performance, Female; it lost to Aretha Franklin's version of "Bridge Over Troubled Water." It sold over two million copies and was awarded a gold disc by the R.I.A.A. Knight performed the hit song on Soul Train. An album of the same name proved to be fairly successful. A couple more minor hits followed, but disagreements with her producer and her label terminated Knight's involvement with Stax.

Later years
After leaving Stax, Knight recorded songs for various small labels, but was not able to gain any more recognition, and ended up performing and touring the local oldie circuit. Things changed in 1981, when Knight met local producer Isaac Bolden, who signed her to his Soulin' label. Together, they came up with a song entitled "You Got the Papers but I Got the Man," an answer song to Richard "Dimples" Fields' record, "She's Got Papers On Me"; that song was leased to Atlantic Records for national release. Soon, Knight found herself touring consistently. In 1985, Knight gained more recognition when she covered Rockin' Sidney's zydeco novelty hit, "My Toot Toot," and found herself in a chart battle with Denise LaSalle's version. While LaSalle's version reached the top ten in the United Kingdom, Knight's version was the more successful in the U.S., reaching No. 50 on the pop chart. Knight was then given a chance to perform it on the TV variety show Solid Gold. The song also became Knight's only hit in South Africa, reaching No. 3.

Although Knight waited twelve years to come out with another recording, she continued touring and performing engagements all over the world, particularly in the Southern states. In 2003, Knight performed her biggest hit, "Mr. Big Stuff", on the PBS special Soul Comes Home. Knight continued to tour and make live performances, often with such artists as Gloria Gaynor. In October 2007, the Louisiana Music Hall of Fame honored Knight for her contributions to Louisiana music by inducting her. Knight's song "Do Me" appeared on the 2007 Superbad soundtrack.

Personal
Knight has been married at least twice and has at least one child. Knight married Thomas Commedore and together they had a son, Emile Commedore. In the early 1970s, Knight was married to New Orleans longshoreman Earl Harris.

Discography

Studio albums

Compilation albums
 1997: The Very Best of Me

Singles

See also
 List of soul musicians
 List of 1970s one-hit wonders in the United States
 List of artists who reached number one on the Billboard R&B chart
 List of acts who appeared on American Bandstand
 List of people who appeared on Soul Train

Notes

References

External links
 
 Jean Knight Online

1943 births
Living people
20th-century African-American women singers
American women singers
American soul singers
American funk singers
Mirage Records artists
Musicians from New Orleans
Stax Records artists
Singers from Louisiana
21st-century African-American people
21st-century African-American women